Grant Township is a township in Jewell County, Kansas, USA.  As of the 2000 census, its population was 220.

Geography
Grant Township covers an area of 35.72 square miles (92.51 square kilometers).

Cities and towns
 Formoso

Adjacent townships
 Sinclair Township (north)
 White Rock Township, Republic County (northeast)
 Courtland Township, Republic County (east)
 Beaver Township, Republic County (southeast)
 Vicksburg Township (south)
 Buffalo Township (southwest)
 Washington Township (west)
 Richland Township (northwest)

Cemeteries
The township contains one cemetery, Balch.

Major highways
 U.S. Route 36

References
 U.S. Board on Geographic Names (GNIS)
 United States Census Bureau cartographic boundary files

External links
 US-Counties.com
 City-Data.com

Townships in Jewell County, Kansas
Townships in Kansas